Hackelochloa is a genus of Asian and African plants in the grass family.

The genus was named after Eduard Hackel, an Austrian botanist, by  Otto Kuntze, in 1891.

Species

Hackelochloa granularis (L.) Kuntze  - sub-Saharan Africa; southern Asia from Yemen to Japan to Indonesia; Papuasia, Micronesia; naturalized in Western Hemisphere from Maryland to Paraguay
Hackelochloa porifera (Hack.) D. Rhind. - Yunnan, Bhutan, Assam, Arunachal Pradesh, Myanmar, Vietnam

References

External links
 line drawing of Hackelochloa porifera from Flora of China Illustrations vol. 22, fig. 901, 4-5 

Andropogoneae
Poaceae genera
Grasses of Africa
Grasses of Asia
Grasses of Oceania